Łukasiewicz is a Polish surname. It comes from the given name Łukasz (Lucas). It is found across Poland, particularly in central regions. It is related to the surnames Łukaszewicz and Lukashevich.

People 
 Antoni Łukasiewicz (born 1983), Polish footballer
 Christophe Lukasiewicz (1933–1999), Polish-French architect
 Ignacy Łukasiewicz (1822–1882), Polish pharmacist and first distiller of clear kerosene
 Jan Łukasiewicz (1878–1956), Polish logician and philosopher
 Józef Michał Łukasiewicz, Polish merchant and politician
 Juliusz Łukasiewicz (1892–1951), Polish diplomat
 Mark Lukasiewicz (born 1973), American baseball player
Milena Łukasiewicz, Polish diplomat
 Piotr Łukasiewicz (born 1974), Polish diplomat

References

See also
 

Polish-language surnames
Patronymic surnames
Surnames from given names